The Global Enterprise Challenge, formerly known as the Enterprise Olympics, arose as a result of an international collaboration between Ken Baker, then Chief Executive of the Enterprise New Zealand Trust, and Gordon McVie, who was at that time with Scottish Enterprise. This challenge is a high-powered student business competition, involving Internet technology and global competitors, and in 2009 was hosted by the University of Strathclyde in Glasgow

The challenge is aimed at secondary and pre-university students from all over the world.

Participants

Participants this year came from:
England
Scotland
Australia
New Zealand
South Africa
Wales
Norway
Germany
United States
Singapore
Japan
Korea
Indonesia
Philippines
Poland

England, Wales, Germany and Norway joined Scotland in Glasgow with the other ten countries competing remotely.

List of winners

2002 – New Zealand

2003 – New Zealand

2004 – Scotland

2005 – Germany

2006 – Wales

2007 – United States

2008 – New Zealand

2009 – Indonesia

2010 – Australia, Earnshaw State College GEC 2010 was hosted by Indonesia in Bali.

2011- Australia, Earnshaw State College

2012 - Australia, Earnshaw State College

2015 – Wales, Coleg Cambria

See also
Entrepreneurial network

References

External links
Global Enterprise Challenge official website 

The Global Enterprise Challenge – EuroHub  

Entrepreneurship organizations